Mansaf is a traditional Levantine dish made of lamb cooked in a sauce of fermented dried yogurt and served with rice or bulgur.

It is a popular dish eaten throughout the Levant. It is considered the national dish of Jordan, and can also be found in Kuwait, Saudi Arabia and Syria. The name of the dish comes from the term "large tray" or "large dish".The dish evolved greatly between the 1940s and late 1980s, undergoing changes in the recipe as well as in the preparation process.

History
The original pastoralist Bedouin mansaf underwent significant changes in the 20th century. The dish is said to originally have been made with simply meat (camel or lamb), meat broth or ghee (clarified butter) and bread. Following the popularization of rice in northern Transjordan in the 1920s, rice gradually was introduced into the dish, at first mixed with bulgur, and later on its own, until the dish reached its modern incarnation of being based on white rice. Similarly, the jameed sauce is a recent development, as the Bedouins did not historically feature jameed in their cooked dishes until their modern sedentarization.

Preparation

Jameed

Jameed is a hard dry yogurt that is prepared by the boiling of sheep or goat's milk, which is then left to dry and ferment. The mixture is later kept in a fine woven cheesecloth to make a thick yogurt. Salt is added daily to thicken the yogurt even more for a few days, which then becomes very dense and is shaped into round balls. The city of Al-Karak in Jordan has a reputation for producing the highest quality of jameed.

Cooking
A jameed broth is prepared and the pieces of lamb are cooked in it. The dish is served on a large platter with a layer of flatbread (markook or shrak) topped with rice and then meat, garnished with almonds and pine nuts, and then the creamy jameed sauce is poured on top of the dish.

Culture and tradition

Mansaf is associated with a traditional Jordanian culture based on an agro-pastoral lifestyle in which meat and yogurt are readily available. Mansaf is served on special occasions such as weddings, births and graduations, or to honor a guest, and on major holidays such as Eid ul-Fitr, Eid ul-Adha, Christmas, Easter and Jordan's Independence Day. It is traditionally eaten collectively from a large platter in the Bedouin and rural style, standing around the platter with the left hand behind the back and using the right hand instead of utensils. Mansaf plays an active role in settling tribal disputes in Jordan in what is known as an Atwa (truce) and a Ja'ha (peacemaking process).  It is thought to signal the end of a conflict when the heads of conflicting tribes visit each other and the host sacrifices a sheep or a goat for a shared mansaf, taken to be a sign of reconciliation.

Since mansaf was originally popular among Bedouins, much of the traditions that they used with the dish still exist today. The tray containing mansaf is placed on a table where people gather around it while standing. Mansaf should be eaten with the use of a person's right hand only while the left is behind the person's back. The hand is used to create balls of rice and then the ball is placed in the mouth through the use of three fingers. It is frowned upon to blow on the ball of rice, no matter how hot. Many of these traditions are still used; however, it can also be eaten with spoons and plates.

Jordan's national dish
Though mansaf is frequently referred to as Jordan's "national dish", Palestinian Professor of Modern Arab Politics and Intellectual History at Columbia University Joseph Massad states that mansaf is not a truly "traditional" dish, but is rather a more recent dish which was developed during the Hashemite-Mandatory era of the early 20th century, and then promulgated as a national dish following independence. Massad notes that the current form of mansaf differs from the independence-era and Mandate-era recipes but is portrayed by the state as a dish that is both national and a Bedouin tradition, despite it also historically being a dish of the peasants and Bedouins of the neighboring regions of southern Palestine and Syria.

Regions and variants
 
The inhabitants of Al-Salt and Al-Karak are reputed to make the best mansaf in Jordan. Other variants of the dish also exist and are adapted to the regional tastes and circumstances. These include fish mansaf, found in the south around the port city of Aqaba. An urban, less ceremonial adaptation of mansaf using non-dried yogurt is called shakreyyeh. It is sometimes cooked with poultry instead of lamb and is common in the northern part of Jordan. In the 2020s, a restaurateur in Amman began selling single servings of mansaf in cups. While some customers find it convenient, others find that it demeans the prestige and honor associated with it.

Evolution

Evolution in the dish 
Prior to 1945, mansaf was made up of three main components: the bread, the meat and the clarified butter. The bread that was used is called khobz al-shrak. It is a whole wheat bread that is described as “thick”, “flat” , “paper-thin” and “crumb-less”. Mansaf was made using whole wheat flour because wheat was an easily accessible crop at the time. The specific type of bread varied based on local regions. The next main component of mansaf was the meat. It was boiled in water in order to clean it from dirt and film that developed on its surface. After the meat was fully cooked, it was added on top of the bread, and the meat broth was poured over the bread. The final step was pouring the clarified butter, called samin beladee, on top.

The first evolutions to change this initial recipe were a decrease in the amount of broth added to the base, and adding bulgur wheat to the meal. This is because bulgur became a widely grown crop around 1945. The wheat was cleaned, boiled, then spread on a clean surface and left to dry in the sun for a few days. Once the drying process was complete, the wheat was ground up, which is what turns it into bulgur wheat. Finally, the bulgur wheat was cooked similar to how rice is cooked today.

Around the 1950s, replacing bulgur wheat with rice started to rise in popularity when making mansaf, due to a city in Jordan called Hartha’s proximity to Syrian and Palestinian borders. This resulted in better access to trade networks.

In the early 1960s, new toppings were introduced to the recipe of mansaf. Those include roasted almonds and pine nuts. A few years after that, the clarified butter and the broth were replaced with jameed, which is a yogurt sauce. People also started cooking the meat in this yogurt sauce, which resulted in a more “robust flavor” which marinated the meat during the cooking process.

Evolution in the preparation process 

Prior to the 1970s, mansaf was cooked in a large copper cauldron that was placed over a fire in the courtyards of one's home. The cauldron was so large that people had no choice but to cook the this dish outdoors. Once the ingredients were fully cooked, they would be placed on a large copper platter and carried indoors.

After the 1970s, many changes occurred to the original recipe and preparation of mansaf. The bread was replaced with rice, and the platter used for the mansaf changed from traditional copper to a florally decorated enamelware or aluminum platter. These changes happened due to advancements in technology, which made it possible for mansaf to be cooked indoors, in smaller amounts for smaller groups of people like families.

See also
 Jordanian cuisine
 List of lamb dishes

References

Further reading
 The Jordan Heritage Encyclopedia/ vol. 1–5: Rox Bin Za’id Al-Uzaizi.
 Cultural history of Jordan during the Mamluk period 1250–1517. Professor Yousef Ghawanmeh. 1979, Workers Cooperative Society presses. Amman, Jordan. 1982, Yarmouk University. Irbid, Jordan. 1986, Ministry of Culture and Youth. Amman, Jordan. 1992, University of Jordan. Amman, Jordan.
Howell, Sally 2003. "Modernizing Mansaf: The Consuming Contexts of Jordan's National Dish", Food and Foodways, 11: 215–243

Arabic words and phrases
Arab cuisine
Levantine cuisine
Jordanian cuisine
Palestinian cuisine
Rice dishes
Lamb dishes
National dishes
Bedouin society